Up Against My Heart is the fifth studio album by American country music artist Patty Loveless. It was her final studio album for MCA Records. The album produced the singles "Hurt Me Bad (In a Real Good Way)", "Jealous Bone", and "Can't Stop Myself from Loving You".

Track listing

Personnel
As listed in liner notes.

Musicians
Deborah Allen – background vocals (track 4)
Jerry Douglas – Dobro
Stuart Duncan – fiddle, mandolin
Paul Franklin – steel guitar
Steve Gibson – acoustic guitar, electric guitar, mandolin (track 6)
Vince Gill – background vocals (tracks 6, 10)
Emory Gordy Jr. – bass guitar
Tim Hensley – background vocals (tracks 2, 3, 7)
John Barlow Jarvis – keyboards
Larrie Londin – drums
Patty Loveless – lead vocals, background vocals (track 10)
Lyle Lovett – background vocals (track 10)
Mac McAnally – acoustic guitar, background vocals (tracks 6, 9, 10)
Dolly Parton – background vocals (track 9)
Steuart Smith – acoustic guitar, electric guitar
Tammy Steffey – background vocals (tracks 2, 3, 7)

Technical
Milan Bogdan - digital editing
Tony Brown - production
Emory Gordy, Jr. - production
John Guess - recording, mixing
Russ Martin - engineering
Glenn Meadows - mastering

Chart performance

References

1991 albums
Patty Loveless albums
MCA Records albums
Albums produced by Tony Brown (record producer)
Albums produced by Emory Gordy Jr.